"Saturation" is an alternative rock song performed by Australian band The Superjesus. The song was released in November 1997 as the second single from the band's debut studio album, Sumo (1998). The song peaked at number 42 on the Australian ARIA Singles Chart.

In January 1999, The song was ranked at number 99 in the Triple J Hottest 100, 1998.

Track listing
CD Single (3984205972)
 "Saturation" - 4:08
 "Face Down" - 3:24

Charts

References

1997 singles
1997 songs
Songs written by Sarah McLeod (musician)
Warner Records singles
The Superjesus songs